Aedan Stanley (born December 13, 1999) is an American professional soccer player who plays as a defender for Miami FC in the USL Championship.

Born in Columbia, Illinois, Stanley began his career with St. Louis Scott Gallagher before starting his professional career with United Soccer League side Saint Louis FC in 2016. In 2018, Stanley began attending Duke University and played college soccer for the Duke Blue Devils. After two seasons with Duke, Stanley joined Portland Timbers 2, playing one season with them before joining Sporting Kansas City II. Shortly after signing, Stanley was drafted in the 2021 MLS SuperDraft by expansion club Austin FC.

Early career

Saint Louis FC
Born in Columbia, Illinois, Stanley was part of the academy at St. Louis Scott Gallagher. On May 21, 2016, Stanley signed a USL amateur contract with United Soccer League side Saint Louis FC, which allowed him to play professionally while maintaining NCAA eligibility. On June 16, he was called into the club's reserve side, Saint Louis FC U23, playing 25 minutes in the 3–2 defeat against Mississippi Brilla. 

Stanley made his United Soccer League debut for Saint Louis FC on September 24, 2016 in a 2–2 draw against OKC Energy. He came on as a 64th minute substitute for Schillo Tshuma.

Duke Blue Devils (college)
In August 2018, Stanley began attending Duke University in Durham, North Carolina and joined their college soccer side, the Duke Blue Devils. He made his collegiate debut on August 24 against the FIU Panthers, starting in the 3–1 victory. During his first season with Duke, Stanley lead the team in starts, starting in 20 matches, while earning All-ACC Freshman honors.

In his second season for the Blue Devils, Stanley started and played in 17 matches, recording three assists.

Club career

Portland Timbers 2
On March 5, 2020, Stanley joined USL Championship club Portland Timbers 2, the reserve affiliate for Major League Soccer side Portland Timbers. He made his Timbers 2 debut on March 7 against Phoenix Rising, starting in the 6–1 away defeat. He started in all 16 matches for the Portland Timbers 2, substituted zero times, and he recorded two assists.

Austin FC
On January 15, 2021, Stanley signed with Sporting Kansas City II. However, a few days later, on January 21, Stanley was drafted with the 21st pick in the MLS SuperDraft by Austin FC. On April 16, 2021, Sporting Kansas City agreed to mutually terminate Stanley's contract with their reserve affiliate. That same day, Stanley signed a professional contract with Austin FC.

Stanley made his debut for Austin FC on May 15 in a 2–0 away defeat against the LA Galaxy, coming on as a 70th minute substitute for Žan Kolmanič.

Following the 2021 season, Stanley's contract option was declined by Austin.

Miami FC
On January 4, 2022, Stanley returned to the USL and signed with Miami FC.

International career
Stanley's first experience of international football came in June 2015, when he was called into the United States under-16 team for the Open Nordic Cup. He was then called into the United States under-18's in August 2016 for the Vaclav Jezek Tournament. He made his debut against Slovakia on August 16, starting in the 3–1 victory.

Career statistics

References

External links
 Profile at Austin FC
 Profile at Duke Blue Devils

1999 births
Living people
People from Columbia, Illinois
Sportspeople from Greater St. Louis
American soccer players
Association football defenders
Duke Blue Devils men's soccer players
Saint Louis FC players
Portland Timbers 2 players
Sporting Kansas City II players
Austin FC players
Miami FC players
Austin FC draft picks
USL League Two players
USL Championship players
Major League Soccer players
Soccer players from Illinois
United States men's youth international soccer players